Ruth Martin-Jones (also known as Ruth Swinhoe and Ruth Howell, born 28 January 1947) is a former long jumper and heptathlete. She competed for Great Britain at the 1972 Summer Olympics in Munich, finishing 28th in the long jump event. She was the first Welsh women to compete at the Olympic Games. At the 1974 British Commonwealth Games in Christchurch, she won a bronze medal competing for Wales. Her jump was equal to silver medalist Brenda Eisler, but Eisler had a better second jump. She also competed at the 1970 British Commonwealth Games in Edinburgh, and the 1978 Commonwealth Games in Edmonton. In 1978, Martin-Jones won the first heptathlon event in the world at the Alexander Stadium in Birmingham.

In 2016, Martin-Jones was inducted into the Welsh Athletics Hall of Fame.

See also
 Athletics at the 1974 British Commonwealth Games

References

External links
 Sports Reference
 

1947 births
Martin-Jones
Martin-Jones
Marin-Jones
Martin-Jones
Marin-Jones
Martin-Jones
Martin-Jones
Martin-Jones
Martin-Jones
Martin-Jones
Martin-Jones
Martin-Jones
Medallists at the 1974 British Commonwealth Games